Cheesecake is a sweet dessert consisting of one or more layers. The main, and thickest, layer consists of a mixture of a soft, fresh cheese (typically cottage cheese, cream cheese or ricotta), eggs, and sugar.  If there is a bottom layer, it most often consists of a crust or base made from crushed cookies (or digestive biscuits), graham crackers, pastry, or sometimes sponge cake. Cheesecake may be baked or unbaked (and is usually refrigerated).

Cheesecake is usually sweetened with sugar and may be flavored in different ways. Vanilla, spices, lemon, chocolate, pumpkin, or other flavors may be added to the main cheese layer.  Additional flavors and visual appeal may be added by topping the finished dessert with fruit, whipped cream, nuts, cookies, fruit sauce, chocolate syrup, or other ingredients.

Culinary classification 

Modern cheesecake is not usually classified as an actual "cake", despite the name (compare with Boston cream "pie"). Some people classify it as a torte due to the usage of many eggs, which are the sole source of leavening, as a key factor. Others find compelling evidence that it is a custard pie, based on the overall structure, with the separate crust, the soft filling, and the absence of flour.  Other sources identify it as a flan, or tart.

Savoury cheesecakes
Smoked salmon cheesecake is a savoury form, containing smoked salmon.  It is most frequently served as an appetizer or a buffet item. Michael Portillo visited a family-run smokehouse on the Isle of Skye, Scotland during his Great British Railway Journeys series.  After sampling their smoked salmon cheesecake he commented "you haven't lived till you've tasted this."
A smoked salmon cheesecake was a prize-winning recipe in 1996 in Better Homes and Gardens' Prize Tested Recipe Contest.  The recipe called for the use of Swiss cheese along with the more usual (for cheesecakes) Ricotta.

History 
An ancient form of cheesecake may have been a popular dish in ancient Greece even prior to Romans' adoption of it with the conquest of Greece. The earliest attested mention of a cheesecake is by the Greek physician Aegimus (5th century BCE), who wrote a book on the art of making cheesecakes (—). Of the three, placenta cake is the most like modern cheesecakes: having a crust that is separately prepared and baked.

A more modern version called a sambocade, made with elderflower and rose water, is found in Forme of Cury, an English cookbook from 1390. On this basis, chef Heston Blumenthal has argued that cheesecake is an English invention.

The modern cheesecake 
The English name cheesecake has been used only since the 15th century, and the cheesecake did not evolve into its modern form until somewhere around the 18th century. Europeans began removing yeast and adding beaten eggs to the cheesecake instead. With the overpowering yeast flavor gone, the result tasted more like a dessert treat. The early 19th-century cheesecake recipes in A New System of Domestic Cookery by Maria Rundell are made with cheese curd and fresh butter. One version is thickened with blanched almonds, eggs and cream, and the cakes may have included currants, brandy, raisin wine, nutmeg and orange flower water.

Modern commercial American cream cheese was developed in 1872, when William Lawrence, from Chester, New York, while looking for a way to recreate the soft, French cheese Neufchâtel, accidentally came up with a way of making an "unripened cheese" that is heavier and creamier; other dairymen came up with similar creations independently.

Modern cheesecake comes in two different types. Along with the baked cheesecake, some cheesecakes are made with uncooked cream cheese on a crumbled-cookie or graham cracker base. This type of cheesecake was invented in the United States.

National varieties 
Cheesecakes can be broadly categorized into two basic types: baked and unbaked. Some do not have a crust or base. Cheesecake comes in a variety of styles based on region:

Africa

South Africa
One popular variant of cheesecake in South Africa is made with whipped cream, cream cheese, gelatin for the filling, and a buttered digestive biscuit crust. It is not baked, and is sometimes made with Amarula liqueur. This variant is very similar to British cheesecake. This cheesecake is more common in British South African communities.

Asia

Japan
Japanese cheesecake, or soufflé-style or cotton cheesecake, is made with cream cheese, butter, sugar, and eggs, and has a characteristically wobbly, airy texture, similar to chiffon cake. No-bake cheesecakes are known as rare cheesecake (Japanese: レアチーズケーキ).

Philippines
The most prominent version of cheesecake in the Philippines is ube cheesecake. It is made with a base of crushed graham crackers and an upper layer of cream cheese and ube halaya (mashed purple yam with milk, sugar, and butter). It can be prepared baked or simply refrigerated. Like other ube desserts in the Philippines, it is characteristically purple in color.

Europe

Spain 
The Basque cheesecake was created in 1990 by Santiago Rivera of the La Viña restaurant in the Basque Country, Spain. It achieved popularity online in the 2010s, helped by a recipe published by the British food writer Nigella Lawson. The Basque cheesecake is composed of burnt custard and no crust.

Russia
Russian-style cheesecake (Vatrushka) is in the form of a dough ring and filled with quark or cottage cheese.

North America

United States
The United States has several different recipes for cheesecake and this usually depends on the region in which the cake is baked, as well as the cultural background of the person baking it.

Chicago 
Chicago-style cheesecake is a baked cream cheese version that is firm on the outside with a soft and creamy texture on the inside. These cheesecakes are often made in a greased cake pan and are relatively fluffy in texture. The crust used with this style of cheesecake is most commonly made from shortbread that is crushed and mixed with sugar and butter. Some frozen cheesecakes are Chicago-style.

New York

New York–style cheesecake uses a cream cheese base, also incorporating heavy cream or sour cream. The typical New York cheesecake is rich and has a dense, smooth, and creamy consistency.

Galleries

Cheesecakes from around the world

Fruit cheesecakes

See also 

 List of desserts
 List of pies, tarts and flans
 List of Kuih, Southeast Asian sweets

References 

Ancient Greek cuisine
Articles containing video clips
British cakes
Custard desserts
English cuisine
Jewish baked goods
German cakes
Israeli cuisine
Types of food
World cuisine
Cheesecakes
American cakes